The Ugong are an ethnic group in Thailand. There are approximately 500 Ugong in the Suphan Buri Province of Thailand. The Ugong are Theravada Buddhists.

References

External links
Ugong, Lawa in Thailand; Joshua Project

Ethnic groups in Thailand